Theodor Stang (14 March 1836 – 20 August 1919) was a Norwegian engineer.

Stang was born in Vang i Valdres. He studied in Belgium. From 1862 he worked in the Netherlands. Stang is especially famous for designing the country's longest railway bridge, the Moerdijk Bridge. He later became waterworks director in The Hague for forty years.

Family 
Theodor Stang was as a son of vicar Thomas Stang (1804–1874). He was a nephew of Frederik Stang, a first cousin of Emil Stang and a first cousin once removed of Fredrik Stang and Emil Stang, Jr.

References

1836 births
1919 deaths
Norwegian engineers
Bridge engineers
Norwegian expatriates in Belgium
Norwegian expatriates in the Netherlands